The Highlander Research and Education Center, formerly known as the Highlander Folk School, is a social justice leadership training school and cultural center in New Market, Tennessee. Founded in 1932 by activist Myles Horton, educator Don West, and Methodist minister James A. Dombrowski, it was originally located in the community of Summerfield in Grundy County, Tennessee, between Monteagle and Tracy City. It was featured in the 1985 documentary film, You Got to Move. Much of the history was documented in the book Or We'll All Hang Separately: The Highlander Idea by Thomas Bledsoe.

Highlander provides training and education for emerging and existing movement leaders throughout the South, Appalachia, and the world. Some of Highlander's earliest contributions were during the labor movement in Appalachia and throughout the Southern United States. During the 1950s, it played a critical role in the American Civil Rights Movement. It trained civil rights leader Rosa Parks prior to her historic role in the Montgomery bus boycott, as well as providing training for many other movement activists, including members of the Student Nonviolent Coordinating Committee (SNCC), Septima Clark, Anne Braden, Martin Luther King Jr., James Bevel, Hollis Watkins, Bernard Lafayette, Ralph Abernathy and John Lewis in the mid- and-late 1950s. Backlash against the school's involvement with the Civil Rights Movement led to the school's closure by the state of Tennessee in 1961. Staff reorganized and moved to Knoxville, Tennessee, where they rechartered Highlander under the name "Highlander Research and Education Center." Highlander has been in its current (and longest consecutive) home in New Market, Tennessee, since 1971. Highlander's archives reside at the Wisconsin Historical Society and the Louis Round Wilson Library at the University of North Carolina at Chapel Hill.

History

Early years
The Highlander Folk School was originally established in Grundy County, Tennessee, on land donated for this purpose by educator Lilian Wyckoff Johnson. When Highlander was founded in 1932, the United States was in the midst of the Great Depression. Workers in all parts of the country were met with major resistance by employers when they tried to organize labor unions, especially in the South. Against that backdrop, Horton, West and Dombrowski created the Highlander School "to provide an educational center in the South for the training of rural and industrial leaders, and for the conservation and enrichment of the indigenous cultural values of the mountains." Horton was influenced by observing rural adult education schools in Denmark started in the 19th century by Danish Lutheran Bishop N. F. S. Grundtvig. During the 1930s and 1940s, the school's main focus was labor education and the training of labor organizers. In the 1930s, Myra Page taught here.

Civil rights
In the 1950s, Highlander turned its energies to the rising issues of civil rights and desegregation. In addition to Myles Horton, Zilphia Horton, and others, a key figure during this period was John Beauchamp Thompson, a minister and educator who became one of the principal fund-raisers and speakers for the school. Highlander worked with Esau Jenkins of Johns Island to develop a literacy program for Blacks who were prevented from registering to vote by literacy requirements. The Citizenship Education Schools coordinated by Septima Clark with assistance from Bernice Robinson spread widely throughout the South and helped thousands of Blacks register to vote. Later, the program was transferred to the Southern Christian Leadership Conference (SCLC), led by Martin Luther King Jr., because the state of Tennessee was threatening to close the school.

Civil rights activists, most notably King, Rosa Parks, John Lewis, and Julian Bond, came to the Center at different times.  Lewis revealed later that he had his first meal in an integrated setting at Highlander. "I was a young adult, but I had never eaten a meal in the company of Black and white diners," the congressman wrote. He continued, "Highlander was the place that Rosa Parks witnessed a demonstration of equality that helped inspire her to keep her seat on a Montgomery bus, just a few weeks after her first visit. She saw Septima Clark, a legendary black educator, teaching side-by-side with (Highlander founder Myles) Horton. For her it was revolutionary. She had never seen an integrated team of equals working together, and it inspired her."

The civil rights anthem, "We Shall Overcome", was adapted from a gospel song, by Highlander music director Zilphia Horton, wife of Myles Horton, from the singing of striking tobacco factory workers from the 1945–1946 Charleston Cigar Factory strike.  Shortly afterward, it was published by folksinger Pete Seeger in the People's Songs bulletin. It was revived at Highlander by Guy Carawan, who succeeded Zilphia Horton as Highlander's music director in 1959. Guy Carawan taught the song to SNCC at their first convening at Shaw University. The song has since spread and become one of the most recognizable movement songs in the world.

Backlash
Highlander has been the target of violence and suppression many times since being founded as the Highlander Folk School in Monteagle, Tennessee, in 1932.

In reaction to the school's work, during the late 1950s, Southern newspapers attacked Highlander for supposedly creating racial strife. In 1957, the Georgia Commission on Education published a pamphlet titled "Highlander Folk School: Communist Training School, Monteagle, Tennessee". A controversial photograph of Martin Luther King Jr. with writer, trade union organizer, civil rights activist and co-founder of the Highlander School Donald Lee West, was published. According to information obtained by the Federal Bureau of Investigation, West was the District Director of the Communist Party in North Carolina, though West denied he had ever been a member of the Communist Party. In 1961, the state of Tennessee revoked Highlander's charter, and confiscated and auctioned the school's land and property. According to Septima Clark's autobiography, Echo In My Soul (page 225), the Highlander Folk School was closed, because it engaged in commercial activities in violation its charter. The Highlander Folk School was chartered by the State of Tennessee as a non-profit corporation without stockholders or owners. Once the State revoked its charter, no one could make a legal claim on any of the property. In 1961, the Highlander staff reincorporated as the Highlander Research and Education Center and moved to Knoxville. In 1971, it relocated to New Market, Tennessee.

Appalachian issues
In the 1960s and 1970s, Highlander focused on worker health and safety in the coalfields of Appalachia. Its leaders, including its former president Mike Clark, played a role in the emergence of the region's environmental justice movement. It helped start the Southern Appalachian Leadership Training (SALT) program, and coordinated a survey of land ownership in Appalachia. In the 1980s and 1990s, Highlander broadened their base into broader regional, national, and international environmentalism; struggles against the negative effects of globalization; grassroots leadership development in under-resourced communities. Beginning in the 1990s, became involved in LGBT issues, both in the U.S. and internationally. Youth-focused organizing is another aspect of Highlander's work.

Community-based and participatory research 
Highlander programming oftentimes incorporates community-led or participatory research projects. This approach can be traced back to Myles Horton and other founding figures in their mission to encourage communities to trust in and learn from their own experiences. In the 1970s, Highlander staff began to plan and facilitate participatory projects surrounding topics that are often complex for non-expert audiences such as environmental risk and corporate land ownership. This work has continued through collaborations that prioritize building relationships and networks so that people with shared stakes can find themselves in conversation with one another.

Popular education 
In line with its stated mission of "supporting [peoples'] efforts to take collective action to shape their own destiny," many Highlander projects incorporate popular education strategies. Popular education, which draws on the experiences and knowledges of a group of people, is often linked to participatory research initiatives. Highlander uses popular education tactics to develop shared leadership and to emphasize the expertise of lived experiences.

Since 2000
Current focuses of Highlander include issues of democratic participation and economic justice, with a particular focus on youth, immigrants to the U.S. from Latin America, African Americans, LGBT, and poor white people. Highlander's work with immigrants focuses on uplifting immigrant and refugee leaders at local, state, and national levels. Their work with immigrant rights focuses on highlighting intersectionality with other social movements and increasing the presence of the US South in the movement.

In 2014, the Tennessee Preservation Trust placed the original Grundy County school building on its list of the ten most "endangered" historic sites in Tennessee.

On March 29, 2019, a fire destroyed a building that housed executive offices at the Highlander Center. Nobody was inside the building, but many items were lost, including decades of historic documents, speeches, artifacts, and memorabilia. White supremacist graffiti, in the form of the Iron Guard symbol, was found at the site, and the county and state are both investigating whether arson was committed.

Directors
The directors of Highlander have been:
 Myles Horton, 1932–1969
 Frank T. Adams, 1970–1973
 Mike Clark, 1973–1978
 Helen Matthews Lewis, 1978–79 
 Mike Clark, 1979–1984
 Hubert E. Sapp, 1984–1993
 John Gaventa, 1993–1996
 Jim Sessions, 1996–1999
 Suzanne Pharr, 1999–2003
 Mónica Hernández and Tami Newman, interim co-directors 2004–2005
 Pam McMichael, interim director, 2005; director 2006–2016
 Ash-Lee Woodard Henderson and Allyn Maxfield Steele, co-directors since 2016

Tennessee Historical Commission Marker
A Tennessee Historical Commission Marker is present near Highlander's original location outside of Monteagle, Tennessee.  The text of the marker reads:

Photo gallery

See also
 Continuing education
 May Justus
 Rand School of Social Science (1906), New York
 Work People's College (1907), Minnesota
 Brookwood Labor College (1921), New York
 New York Workers School (1923):
 New Workers School (1929) 
 Jefferson School of Social Science (1944)
 Highlander School
 Commonwealth College (Arkansas) (1923-1940) 
 Southern Appalachian Labor School (since 1977)
 San Francisco Workers' School (1934)
 California Labor School (formerly Tom Mooney Labor School) (1942)
 Appalshop (1969), Kentucky

Notes

References
 Highlander Research and Education Center: Highlander Research and Education Center Records, Wisconsin Historical Society.
 Highlander Research and Education Center's Audiovisual Materials, Southern Folklife Collection, Wilson Library, University of North Carolina at Chapel Hill.
 John M. Glen, Highlander: No Ordinary School, 1932–1962.  The University Press of Kentucky, 1988. 
 Federal Bureau of Investigation Highlander Folk School files obtained under the Freedom of Information Act
 Frank Adams, with Myles Horton, Unearthing Seeds of Fire: The Idea of Highlander. John F. Blair: 1975. 
 Jeff Biggers, "The United States of Appalachia: How Southern Mountaineers Brought Independence, Culture and Enlightenment to America". Emeryville, CA: Shoemaker and Hoard. 
 Myles Horton, with Herbert and Judith Kohl, The Long Haul: An Autobiography.  Teachers College Press: 1997. 
 Myles Horton and Paulo Friere, We Make the Road by Walking. Temple University Press: 1990. 
 History - 1930–1953: Beginnings & The Labor Years
 Highlander Folk School
 Highlander Research and Education Center
 Pam McMichael, "Dear Friend of Highlander", Highlander Reports, April 2005, (PDF)
 Eliot Wigginton, ed., Refuse to Stand Silently By: An Oral History of Grass Roots Social Activism in America, 1921–1964.  Doubleday, 1991.  
 Highlander Research and Education Center's Audiovisual Materials #20361, Southern Folklife Collection, Louis Round Wilson Library, University of North Carolina at Chapel Hill.
 Highlander Research and Education Center Records, 1917–2005, Wisconsin Historical Society.

External links
 

 Highlander Research and Education Center Records, 1917-1978 at the Wisconsin Historical Society--Over 350,000 documents and 1800 audio recordings from the Highlander Folk School
 "Integrated in All Respects": Ed Friend's Highlander Folk School Film and the Politics of Segregation in the Digital Library of Georgia
 Myles F. Horton, Tennessee's "Radical Hillbilly": The Highlander Folk School and Education for Social Change in America, the South, and the Volunteer State By James B. Jones, Jr. Southern History Net website.
 The Highlander Folk School's FBI files, hosted at the Internet Archive:
 Part 1
 Part 2
 Part 3
 Part 4
 Part 5
 Part 6
 Part 7
 Highlander Folk School 25th Anniversary, Civil Rights Digital Library.

Education in Tennessee
History of civil rights in the United States
History of labor relations in the United States
Labor schools
Monteagle, Tennessee
Education in Jefferson County, Tennessee
New Market, Tennessee
Educational institutions established in 1932
Labor studies organizations
Leadership training
Buildings and structures in Jefferson County, Tennessee
History of Knoxville, Tennessee
1932 establishments in Tennessee